Mark IV or Mark 4 often refers to the fourth version of a product, frequently military hardware. "Mark", meaning "model" or "variant", can be abbreviated "Mk."

Mark IV or Mark 4 can specifically refer to:

Computers
 MARK IV (software), a 1960s-era 4th-generation programming language from Informatics
 Harvard Mark IV (1952), an all-electronic stored-program computer
 Emergency Medical Hologram Mark IV, in Star Trek: Voyager, an artificially intelligent medical program

Music
 The Mark IV,  American vocal group, 1950s
 The Mark Four (1966–1968), an English band
 MARK IV (Barbershop), a barbershop quartet that won the 1969 SPEBSQSA competition
 Mesa Boogie Mark IV (1993–2008), an electric guitar amplifier
 Disklavier#Mark IV, a reproducing piano sold by Yamaha Corporation

Religion
 Mark 4 or Mark IV, the fourth chapter of the Gospel of Mark in the New Testament of the Bible
 Patriarch Mark IV of Alexandria, Greek patriarch of Alexandria in 1385–1389
 Pope Mark IV of Alexandria (died 1363), Coptic Pope in 1348–1363

Vehicles
 Mark 4 (Iarnród Éireann), Irish Rail InterCity train
 Mark IV monorail, train used at Walt Disney World, 1971–1989
 Mark IV tank, an up-armoured variant of the British Mark I tank, 1917
 Bristol Blenheim Mk.IV, light bomber in Royal Air Force service before and during World War II
 British Rail Mark 4, passenger train
 Chandelle Mk IV, ultralight aircraft
 Cozy MK IV, an experimental 4 place canard aircraft derived by Nat Puffer from the Burt Rutan Long-EZ
 Jaguar Mark IV (1945–1949), British car
 Continental Mark IV (1959, 1972–1976), American luxury car
 Merkava Mark IV (1999), main battle tank of Israel Defense Forces
 Triumph Spitfire, MKIV (1970–1974), a British sports car

Weapons
 Webley Mk IV, a.k.a. "Boer War Model"; .455 caliber British revolver from 1899
 MK IV Series 80 M1911 pistol, semi-automatic pistol
 Mark 4 nuclear bomb (1949–1953), an American nuclear bomb

Other
 Canon EOS-1D Mark IV, a digital SLR
 Navy Mark IV (late 1950s–early 1960s), a full pressure suit designed for unpressurized military jets
 Vickers Tank Periscope MK.IV (1936), designed in Poland
 Mk IV Turtle helmet (1950s–1980s), British Army helmet, a slight design change from the Mk III Turtle helmet

ca:Tanc Mark#Variants i desenvolupaments